Odontophloeus is a genus of beetles in the family Laemophloeidae, containing the following species:

 Odontophloeus crybetes Thomas
 Odontophloeus dives Sharp
 Odontophloeus kesseli Hetschko
 Odontophloeus quadridentatus Champion

References

Laemophloeidae
Cucujoidea genera